Vasili Andreyevich Pinchuk (born 8 December 1994) is a Russian football player.

Club career
He made his professional debut in the Russian Football National League for FC Dynamo Saint Petersburg on 19 July 2014 in a game against FC Tyumen.

He played for the main squad of FC Kuban Krasnodar in the Russian Cup.

References

External links
 
 

1994 births
Living people
Russian footballers
Association football defenders
Footballers from Saint Petersburg
FC Kuban Krasnodar players
FC Dynamo Saint Petersburg players
FC Volgar Astrakhan players
Russian expatriate footballers
Expatriate footballers in Estonia
JK Narva Trans players
Meistriliiga players
FC Tom Tomsk players
FC Leningradets Leningrad Oblast players
FC Olimp-Dolgoprudny players
Russian expatriate sportspeople in Estonia